The Kia Spectra is a compact car produced by Kia Motors between 2000 and 2009. It succeeded the Kia Sephia and it was replaced by the Kia Forte (also known as Kia Cerato in some markets).

First generation

Second generation 

Spectra